The Lithuanian A Lyga 1998–99 was the ninth season of top-tier football in Lithuania. The season started on 10 July 1998 and ended on 13 June 1999. 13 teams participated and FK Žalgiris Vilnius won the championship.

Final table

Results

Relegation play-off 

|}

References

LFF Lyga seasons
1999 in Lithuanian football
1998 in Lithuanian football
Lith